The 1980 Toray Sillook Open was a women's singles tennis tournament played on indoor carpet courts at Yoyogi National Gymnasium in Tokyo in Japan. The event was part of the AAAA category of the 1980 Colgate Series. It was the eighth edition of the tournament and was held from 8 September through 14 September 1980. First-seeded Billie Jean King won the title and earned $34,000 first-prize money.

Finals

Singles
 Billie Jean King defeated  Terry Holladay 7–5, 6–4
It was King's 3rd singles title of the year and the 126th of her career.

Prize money

Notes

References

External links
 International Tennis Federation (ITF) tournament event details

Toray Sillook Open
Pan Pacific Open
Toray Sillook Open
Toray Sillook Open
Toray Sillook Open
Toray Sillook Open